Dorothea Friederike von Schlegel (24 October 1764 – 3 August 1839) was a German novelist and translator.

Life
She was born as Brendel Mendelssohn in 1764 in Berlin. Oldest daughter of the philosopher Moses Mendelssohn, a leading figure in the German Enlightenment (Aufklärung). In 1783 she married the merchant and banker Simon Veit, brother of the physician David Veit.  Their son, Philipp Veit, would later become part of a circle of German Christian painters called "the Nazarenes," who influenced the English painters in the Pre-Raphaelite Brotherhood.  She met the poet and critic Friedrich von Schlegel in the salon of her friend Henriette Herz in July 1797, after which Dorothea divorced Simon on 11 January 1799.

She obtained custody of her younger son, Philipp, and lived with him in an apartment on Ziegelstraße in Jena, which became a salon frequented by Tieck, Schelling, the Schlegel brothers, and Novalis.

In 1801 her novel Florentin was published anonymously by Schlegel. Dorothea and Friedrich lived in Paris from 1802 until 1804, and after her divorce they married as Protestants. In 1807 she translated Corinne by Madame de Staël from French.

In 1808, Friedrich and Dorothea converted to Catholicism. (She may have adopted the name "Dorothea" from a 17th-century Dorothea von Schlegel who composed Catholic hymns). They continued to visit the salons of Rahel Levin and Henriette Herz, as well as the constellation which surrounded Madame de Staël.  Friedrich died in 1829, after which Dorothea moved to Frankfurt am Main.  There, she lived with her son Philipp (also a convert to a medieval style of Catholicism) until her death in 1839.

Importance in cultural history
As the daughter of a member of the German literary establishment, Moses Mendelssohn, Dorothea was surrounded throughout her life by poets, critics, musicians, novelists, and philosophers of Europe.  Gotthold Ephraim Lessing was her father's closest friend and colleague, and the Emancipation and secularization of the Jews and Jewish culture was a direct outcome of their work. (Mendelssohn was the model for Nathan der Weise in Lessing's play of the same name.) Dorothea's brother, Joseph, was a friend and sponsor of Alexander von Humboldt, the naturalist and ethnologist.  Felix Mendelssohn, the composer, and his sister Fanny Mendelssohn, also a gifted musician, were her nephew and niece.

Most of her work, letters, biographies, etc. seem to be available only in German.  And there, with the legacy of the Holocaust, she would seem to have an ambiguous status.  The emancipation of European Jewry, in which she and her family played a significant role, became the main target of the Third Reich and its Nuremberg Laws.

For some Jews, she may be a less than admirable figure as well, having left her Jewish husband, violated her divorce settlement, and converted first to Protestantism, and finally to Catholicism.  Most of her later friends were Christians, assimilated or intermarried Jews (like Rahel Levin), or secular Deists and materialists.  Her association with Germaine de Staël was obviously of the greatest importance, since Mme de Staël was also the patron and literary companion of Dorothea's second husband, Friedrich Schlegel. The daughter of Jacques Necker, Louis XVI's finance minister, de Staël witnessed the collapse of the Bourbons and the French Revolution. (See Christopher Herrold's "Mistress to an Age.") It was probably through de Staël's husband, a Swedish Count, that the Schlegels were granted a title of nobility in the Swedish court.

Works
Florentin. Lübeck and Leipzig, 1801.
"Gespräch über die neueren Romane der Französinnen" [Conversation about recent novels of French women writers] in: Europa: Eine Zeitschrift (journal edited by Friedrich Schlegel), 1803, vol. 1, part 2, pp. 88–106
Geschichte des Zauberers Merlin [Story of the Magician Merlin]. Leipzig, 1804. Translated and adapted from French sources

Notes

Further reading
Heike Brandstädter, Katharina Jeorgakopulos: Dorothea Schlegel, Florentin. Lektüre eines vergessenen Textes. Argument, Hamburg 2001, 
Michael A. Meyer (1997), "Judaism and Christianity," chapter 5 in: Meyer, Michael Brenner, & Stefi Jersch-Wenzel (Eds.), German-Jewish History in Modern Times, Volume 2: Emancipation and Acculturation, 1780–1871 (pp. 168–198). New York: Columbia University Press.  On Dorothea Schlegel, pp. 179–180. 
Gisela Horn: Romantische Frauen. Caroline Michaelis-Böhmer-Schlegel-Schelling, Dorothea Mendelssohn-Veit-Schlegel, Sophie Schubart-Mereau-Brentano. Hain, Rudolstadt 1996, 

Elke Steiner: Die anderen Mendelssohns. Dorothea Schlegel, Arnold Mendelssohn. Reprodukt, Berlin 2004, 
Carola Stern: "Ich möchte mir Flügel wünschen". Das Leben der Dorothea Schlegel. Rowohlt, Reinbek 1991, 
Margarete Susman: Frauen der Romantik. Insel, Frankfurt am Main und Leipzig 1996, 
F. Corey Roberts: "The Perennial Search for Paradise: Garden Design and Political Critique in Dorothea Schlegel’s Florentin." The German Quarterly, 75.3 (2002): 247–64.

External links

Literatur von und über Dorothea Schlegel im Katalog der Deutschen Nationalbibliothek
Henriette Herz über Dorothea Schlegel
Panwitz.net

1764 births
1839 deaths
18th-century German Jews
Converts to Roman Catholicism from Lutheranism
German Roman Catholics
French–German translators
English–German translators
Mendelssohn family
19th-century German novelists
19th-century German women writers
Burials at Frankfurt Main Cemetery
People of the Haskalah